Racquetball competitions at the 2015 Pan American Games in Toronto will be held from July 19 to 26. The venue for the competitions was the Direct Energy Centre (Exhibition Centre) Hall C, due to naming rights the venue will be known as the latter for the duration of the games. A total of six events were contested (three each for men and women). After the games, the four courts created for the games were disassembled and relocated to Regina, Saskatchewan.

Competition schedule

The following is the competition schedule for the racquetball competitions:

Medal table

Medalists

Men's events

Women's events

Participating nations
A total of 13 countries have qualified athletes. The number of athletes a nation has entered is in parentheses beside the name of the country.

Qualification

A total of 56 athletes will qualify to compete at the Games (30 male, 26 female). Each country is allowed to enter a maximum of four male and four female athletes.

References

 
Events at the 2015 Pan American Games
Pan American Games
2015
Racquetball in Canada
Racquetball at multi-sport events